CCT may refer to:

Computation
 Computational complexity theory
 Computer-Controlled Teletext, an electronic circuit, see Teletext
 Internet Computer Chess Tournament

Economics
 Compulsory Competitive Tendering, see Best value
 Conditional cash transfer
 Currency Carry Trade, see Carry (investment)

Education
 Center for Computation and Technology at Louisiana State University, USA
 Clarkson College of Technology, the original name of Clarkson University
 Communication, Culture & Technology, M.A. program at Georgetown University
 College of Ceramic Technology at Kolkata, India
 Centre for Converging Technologies, University of Rajasthan at Jaipur, India
 Cisco Certified Technician, an IT certification from Cisco Systems

Government 
 Congo Chine Télécoms, now Orange RDC, a company of the Democratic Republic of the Congo
 Constitutional Court of Thailand
 United States Air Force Combat Control Team

Medicine and psychology
 Caring Cancer Trust
 Certificate of Completion of Training, which doctors in the UK receive on completion of their specialist training
 Client-Centered Therapy, see Person-centered psychotherapy
 Cognitive complexity theory
 Controlled Cord Traction, a technique used to manage certain types of  Postpartum haemorrhage
 Cortical collecting tubule in kidney

Religion
 Christian Churches Together, an ecumenical organization
 Christian Community Theater, a theater program for ages eight to adult
 Churches Conservation Trust, a charity to conserve redundant churches in England

Science 
 Carbon capture technology, various technologies used in carbon capture
 Coal pollution mitigation ("clean coal") technology
 Cold cathode tube
 Colossal carbon tube
 Continuous cooling transformation
 Correlated color temperature
 GCxGC
 Catch connective tissue
 CCT, a codon for the amino acid Proline

Social science 
 Consumer culture theory

Sports 
 Coca-Cola Tigers, former basketball team

Transportation
 California Coastal Trail
 Capital Crescent Trail, Washington, DC
 Central California Traction Company, railroad in California, reporting marks CCT
 Cobb Community Transit serving Cobb County Georgia (US), now known as CobbLinc
 Corridor Cities Transitway, a proposed transit line in Montgomery County, Maryland
 Cotswold Canals Trust, a canal restoration trust in southern England
 Covered Carriage Truck, a Mk1 British Rail carriage
 Cross City Tunnel, a road tunnel in Sydney